Barßel is a municipality in the district of Cloppenburg, in Lower Saxony, Germany.

Division of the municipality
Barßel consists of 13 districts:
 Barßel
 Barßelermoor
 Carolinenhof
 Elisabethfehn
 Harkebrügge
 Lohe
 Loher-Ostmark
 Loher-Westmark
 Neuland
 Neulohe
 Osterhausen
 Reekenfeld
 Roggenberg

Sons and daughters 
 Laurentius Siemer (1888-1956) German Dominican priest, and Provincial of the Dominican Province of Teutonia
 Christian Claaßen (born 1969), German footballer

References

External links
  

Cloppenburg (district)